The women's individual table tennis – Class 11 tournament at the 2016 Summer Paralympics in Rio de Janeiro took place during 8–12 September 2016 at Riocentro Pavilion 3. This class was for athletes with intellectual impairment.

In the preliminary stage, athletes competed in two groups of three. Winners and runners-up of each group qualified to the semifinals.

Results

Preliminary round

Group A

Group B

References

WI11
Para